The following are the national records in athletics in Netherlands Antilles maintained by Nederlands Antilliaanse Atletiek Unie (NAAU). The country was dissolved in 2010.

Outdoor

Men

Women

Indoor

Men

Women

OT = oversized track

References

External links

Netherlands Antilles
Records